Felicia Adebola Adeyoyin (6 November 1938 – 1 May 2021) was a University of Lagos professor and a princess from the Iji ruling house of Saki, Oyo State. She was the author of the Nigerian national pledge.

Early life 
Felicia Awujoola was born on 6 November 1938 in Ogbomoso, Oyo State. She attended Idi-Aba a Christian Baptist School from 1953 and graduated in 1957 from its teacher programme. In 1965 she married  Solomon Adedeji Adeyoyin, who had attended Idi-Aba's brother school, the Baptist Boys' High School.

Education 
She received her Bachelor's Degree with honors in Geography from Birkbeck, University of London in 1968 and then her Diploma of Education at the same university in 1976, followed by an M.A. in Social Studies from Columbia University, New York in 1977, before finally earning her PhD in 1981 from the University of Lagos.

Career 
Adeyoyin was Professor of Education at the University of Lagos and a consultant for the United Nations. 

In 1976, she wrote the pledge published in the July 15 edition of the Daily Times in an article titled "Loyalty to the Nation, Pledge". Then-Head of State Olusegun Obasanjo modified the pledge and introduced it as the national pledge, decreeing that school children should recite it during assembly.

Adeyoyin was also Deaconess of Yaba Baptist Church, Yaba.

Death 
Adeyoyin died on 1 May 2021 after a brief illness.

Awards 
In 2005, Adeyoyin was given a national award, the Officer of the Order of the Niger (OON).

References 

1938 births
2021 deaths
Nigerian princesses
Nigerian royalty
20th-century Nigerian women writers
University of Lagos alumni
Officers of the Order of the Niger
People from Oyo State
20th-century Nigerian writers
Nigerian women academics
Academic staff of the University of Lagos
Nigerian Christians
Deaconesses
Columbia Graduate School of Arts and Sciences alumni
Nigerian consultants
Alumni of Birkbeck, University of London